The Miramar Drive Residential Historic District is located in Allouez, Wisconsin.

History
The area that is now the district was originally platted in 1924. It would become known as an affluent neighborhood, featuring residences of many individuals associated with the Green Bay Packers, including Curly Lambeau. Other common profession found include physicians and lawyers.

The district was added to the State Register of Historic Places in 2017 and to the National Register of Historic Places the following year.

References

Historic districts on the National Register of Historic Places in Wisconsin
National Register of Historic Places in Brown County, Wisconsin